Angry Birds Space is a physics-based puzzle game and the fifth game in the Angry Birds video game series. It is developed and published by Rovio Entertainment. Angry Birds Space was released on March 22, 2012. The game was featured in NASA videos and the game features NASA spacecraft that when found unlock unique levels. Angry Birds Space was discontinued on February 3, 2020 along with Angry Birds Rio, Angry Birds Star Wars and Angry Birds Star Wars ll, with the games also being pulled out of app stores.

Gameplay

Unlike the previous Angry Birds games, the stage is no longer flat, instead comprising several different planets, each of which has its own gravitational field that affects the trajectory of the birds after launch. There is an aiming system that makes it easier to aim the birds. Some pigs are in space bubbles, and when the birds break them, they will freeze and smash unless they get into a gravity field. Like in Angry Birds Rio, Angry Birds Space features boss fights.

Discontinuation

The game was removed from the App Store and Google Play. It was discontinued on February 3, 2020.

Release
In February 2012, Rovio announced a new game in the Angry Birds series to be called Angry Birds Space. Angry Birds Space launched on March 22, 2012, and features elements from the preceding Angry Birds games as well as new gameplay mechanics. The game initially contained 60 levels with additional levels available as free updates or with in-app purchases. 
For the launch of the game, Rovio partnered with wireless carrier T-Mobile to erect a  contraption, with a  red bird resting in it at the Seattle Space Needle to make it look like a slingshot. 

On March 8, 2012, new footage of Angry Birds Space, presented by NASA astronaut Donald Pettit on board the International Space Station, was released. The video shows that the game's stage is no longer flat, instead comprising several different planetoids, each of which has its own gravitational field that affects the trajectory of the birds after launch. NASA states that such collaboration with Rovio Mobile may share the excitement of space with the Angry Birds community, educate users on NASA's programs, and create interactive educational experiences for the public.

Rovio also partnered with Samsung with the Samsung Galaxy Note for the game's release.  The release included free Danger Zone levels and exclusive level for the Galaxy Note until June 21, 2012 for Samsung Galaxy users only when downloaded from the Google Play Store or Samsung Apps (now Samsung Galaxy Store).

The game features variations of the existing bird character and one new character that each carry their own unique abilities.
As of June 1, 2012, Angry Birds Space has been downloaded a total of 100 million times since launching on iOS, Android, PC, and Mac.

In April 2012, the first update for Angry Birds Space was released and contained "Fry Me to the Moon", a new episode with 10 new levels. In May 2012, a further update was released with the first 10 levels of the next episode "Utopia". In June 2012 an update for the Android version included "Danger Zone", an in-app purchase with 30 challenging levels that had previously been available for iOS and the Space Eagle. In July 2012, Rovio released an update unlocking the rest of the levels in "Utopia", as well as 10 new Bonus Levels. On August 23, 2012, an update containing the first 20 levels of the next episode, entitled "Red Planet", was released, in conjunction with the landing of the Curiosity rover, which the Space Pigs hijack for their own ends.  On November 1, Angry Birds Space was updated to complete "Red Planet" and added one Space Eagle bonus level for each episode.  These are unlocked by getting 100% on each level using the Space Eagles. On January 10, 2013, an update  added "Pig Dipper", that featured water physics, and includes a boss fight against the King Pig's submarine. The update also introduces new power-ups: the Flock of Birds, which launches four small versions of the bird with the power-up active, the Pig Puffer, which inflates certain pigs in the level, and the Space Egg, which is an egg that destroys whatever it lands on. On March 7, 2013, rock legend Slash made his own music for the Angry Birds Space theme. On September 13, 2013, Rovio released "Cosmic Crystals", which adds crystals and breakable crystal planets. On June 5, 2014, Rovio added "Beak Impact", which adds 40 levels and 10 bonus levels. On January 21, 2015, Rovio released "Mirror Worlds" and "Brass Hogs", which adds mirrored levels of every level (Except Eggsteroids, Danger Zone and Solar System) and 30 levels of Brass Hogs. This update also introduced a new power-up, Wingman from Angry Birds Friends and Froot Loops Bloopers episode which has 5 themed levels and Toucan Sam instead of the Space Eagle for advertising by Kellogg's. It also adds 5 levels for trying power-ups and daily missions everyday, three each day to unlock Brass Hogs levels.

Reception

The game has received generally favorable reviews with a Metacritic score of 83/100 based on 30 reviews. Justin Davis, writing for IGN, gave the game a score of 8.5/10, calling the pricing and physics disappointing but concluding that "neither issue detracts from the game's overall quality or fun factor." Harry Slater of Pocket Gamer thought the game was "as much fun as its predecessor" adding that it had "enough new concepts to keep even the hardiest fans entertained".

The game was downloaded 50 million times in 35 days. According to Rovio it made the game the fastest-growing mobile game ever.

References

External links

 

Science fiction video games
2012 video games
Android (operating system) games
Space
BlackBerry 10 games
Delisted digital-only games
IOS games
NASA in fiction
Video games set in outer space
MacOS games
Universal Windows Platform apps
Puzzle video games
Symbian games
Video games developed in Finland
Windows games
Windows Phone games
Rovio Entertainment games
Products and services discontinued in 2020
Single-player video games